The Breitenauriegel (colloquially also called the Breitenauer Riegel) is a mountain in the Bavarian Forest of Germany.

At the top is a summit rock with a summit cross and view looking northwest towards  Gotteszell. North of the Breitenauriegel, towards, Geißkopf, is the plateau of  Oberbreitenau. Various footpaths from Habischried, Bischofsmais, Rusel and Rohrmünz, including the Main-Danube Way with the Ostlinie make their way to the summit. About 750 metres southeast of the top is a works hut for the Deggendorf branch of the mountain rescue service, the Bergwacht.

The peak and most of the mountainsides are in the Special Area of Conservation called the Deggendorfer Vorwald.

References

External links 

One-thousanders of Germany
Mountains of Bavaria
Mountains of the Bavarian Forest
Deggendorf (district)
Regen (district)